Altit Fort is an ancient fort in the Altit town in the Hunza valley in Gilgit Baltistan, Pakistan. It was originally home to the hereditary rulers of the Hunza state who carried the title of 'Mir', although they moved to the somewhat younger Baltit fort nearby three centuries later. Altit Fort and in particular the Shikari tower is around 1100 years old, which makes it the oldest monument in the Gilgit–Baltistan. The fort has received the
UNESCO Asia Pacific Heritage Award for Cultural Heritage Conservation in 2011.

History

The word 'Altit' means 'this side down' and the area around the fort is inhabited by Burusho people. In the 16th century the local prince married a princess from Baltistan who brought master Balti craftsmen to built two forts (Altit and Baltit forts). The people of Altit are said to belong to the White Huns, although not much research has gone into the matter. There are several theories about their origin but local indigenous origin holds much value among the people. It is also said that the present language Burushaski was brought here by the White Huns in 47 A.D but there is no link between Burushaski and any other language of today. According to the legend the first name for Altit village was Hunukushal, meaning the village of Huns. The Huns came from the Huang-Ho valley in China. The name later changed to Broshal, translated as a village of Bruchiski speakers. They were spirit worshipers as Shamanism was in practice and also followed Buddhism and Hinduism. In the 15th century Islam was introduced. Around 1830 in turn many converted to Ismailism.

Restoration

The Altit Fort was in great disrepair, but has recently been restored by the Aga Khan Trust for Culture Historic Cities Support Programme and the Government of Norway. It is characterized by small rooms and low portals with exquisite wood carvings. Altit Fort is a tourist site which has been open to the public since 2007.

Tribes
According to the local elders white Huns from the soldier of Alexander started human settlement in Altit when they were on way back from China. It is said that these were the ancestors of the Khanu Kuts tribe of Altit. Presently, majority of households of this tribe are living within the old cluster settlement known as Burum Khan. The Khunu kuts still has the status of Saath Guy; the privilege of starting any activity/event/work/festival within the village. On the other hand, people from Hussain kuts also claim to be the earlier settler in Altit. They claim that Hussain is modified from Hun. It is said that for centuries Hussain kuts remained as a ruling and strong tribe within the village. It is narrated that this tribe was strong and thus creating troubles for the Raja of Gilgit. Therefore, the Raja with the help of other tribes ordered mass killing of the people of this tribe.

The origin of different tribes and sub-tribes reveals that people from different regions migrated to Altit and permanently settled down. Presently, the people of Altit belong to one of these four major tribes. These tribes are divided into Gutti. The origin of the sub-tribes may also be different from the major one.

Husain Kuts
It is said that the ancestor of this tribe migrated from Tibet or Ladakh. The local people also relate their arrival with the invasion of Kisar on Altit. The Husain Kuts is divided into below sub-tribes or Gutti:
 Bakoo kuts,
 Garusin kuts,
 Bhuthe kuts,
 Faratu kuts,
 Ghauin kuts,
 Ghulapee kuts,
 Matum kuts,
 Rosh kuts,
 Shalanga kuts,
 Shamir kuts,
 Shahthurai kuts,
 Quttosh kuts

Khano Kuts
According to the elders of this tribe the ancestors of different Gutti migrated from Tajikistan, Zabak, Diamer and Thakar Khan, Hopper, Nagar. Sub-tribes include:
 Dhathu kuts
 Hun kuts (Laghan kuts)
 Jerovf kuts
 Bai kuts
 Jaturi kuts
 Dhudu kuts
 Khanjafa kuts
 Lachur kuts
 Abdulali kuts
 Masak Kutz
 Fuk kutz

Hukalo Kuts
According to the elders of the tribe, the ancestor of this tribe migrated from Baltistan and was belonging to the Royal family. Later on some other people migrated from Shigar and Nagar and joined this tribe. The tribe is subdivided into below Gutti:
 Moankuts a)Mamu kuts, b) Moukuts
 Sort kuts
 Nazar kutz
 Mushkil kuts
 Baghorik
 Jinu kuts
 Bathu kuts
 Bulush kuts
 Toq kuts
 Attakuz
 Galyu kutz
Habib Kutz

Shoshorating
According to the elders of the tribe the ancestor of this tribe migrated to Altit from Rome. According to oral traditions some people from Rome migrated to Bakhtar in Eastern Iran where they ruled for about 3–4 years. After that they had a battle with the troops of central government and thus left the area and entered in Afghanistan and to Hidukush region. After many years they reached to the present day Altit and settled there. However, different Gutti relate their origins from different areas. Presently, the tribe has below main Gutti:
 Noormuhammed kuts
 Almaaz kuts
 Khoja kuts
 Mumbara kuts
 Su kuts
 Adai kuts
 Muyo kuts
 Aman kuts
 Ashur kuts
 Pashu kuts

Gallery

See also
Baltit Fort
Shigar Fort
Khaplu Fort
 Ganish
 Hunza Valley
 Hunza Princely State
 List of forts in Pakistan
List of museums in Pakistan

References

External links

Hunza Nagar - Altit Fort
Altit e-Village
Oriental Architecture - Altit Fort

Forts in Gilgit-Baltistan
Aga Khan Trust for Culture projects
Hunza